Pakka may refer to:

Pakka, structure in Indian vernacular architecture 
Pakka (film)
Pakka Saharana, village of the Hanumangarh district in Rajasthan state of western India
Irada Pakka Marathi film  2010